Buellia schaereri is a species of lichen in the family Caliciaceae. It was formally described as a new species in 1849 by Italian botanist Giuseppe De Notaris. The botanical name honours Swiss pastor and lichenologist Ludwig Schaerer. It is a widely distributed lichen, occurring in Africa, Asia, Northern and Central Europe, Macaronesia, Central America, and North America. It grows on the bark and wood of trees, especially conifers and oak.

Description
Buellia schaereri has a thin, effuse, pale grey thallus. It has dark brown to black apothecia that measure 0.2–0.3 mm in diameter, with a flat to convex disc. The ascospores it makes are smooth and thin-walled with a single septum and typical dimensions of 6–10 by 2.5–4 μm. Pycnidia are visible as tiny (50–70 μm) black specks on the thallus surface; they are often numerous. They produce short oblong to ellipsoid conidia measuring 2–3 by 1–1.4 μm.

See also
List of Buellia species

References

schaereri
Lichen species
Lichens of Africa
Lichens of Asia
Lichens of Europe
Lichens of Central America
Lichens of Macaronesia
Lichens of North America
Lichens described in 1846
Taxa named by Giuseppe De Notaris